The word "Dheevara" is of Sanskrit origin, and has been used to describe fishermen in Gautama DharmasutraMahabharata. The Dheevara community is a powerful caste in Kerala. These castes were traditionally employed as fisherman. Dheevara Mahasabha ("Dheevara Great Assembly"), which is a politically powerful organization. Guru Veda Vyasa was born into the Dheevara caste. Vyasa, the legendary author of the Mahabharata, Vedas, and Puranas, some of the most important works in the Hindu tradition. He is also called Veda Vyāsa, was born to this community. The community was formed by Arayan, Valan and other castes to lobby for the fishers' rights, and to seek caste-based reservations in government jobs.

Categorization 
The following castes are categorized as Dheevara in the Government's list of Other Backward Classes:

See also 

 Dhimar and Dhivar, fishing castes of North India, whose names are also derived from the word "Dheevara",and they are not related with malayali dheevarar

References

Bibliography 

 
 

 Castes and Tribes of Southern India Edgar Thurston Castes And Tribes Of Southern India Vol.7 (t-z) 

Indian castes

Fishing communities in India